Mount Queen Mary is located  southwest of Destruction Bay, Yukon.
The mountain was named in 1935, along with the nearby (6 km away) Mount King George, for George V’s and Queen Mary's silver jubilee, or 25 years of rule.

Although large, the mountain has easy angle aspects, in particular from the north. The first ascent took place in 1961, when a seven-person team from Seattle climbed the northeast ridge. The west ridge was first climbed in 1978 by a Canadian team including a dog. Several other ascents of the peak have been made, but largely from the north and west sides of the mountain.

See also
 Mountain peaks of Canada
 Mountain peaks of North America

References

External links 
 Mount Queen Mary photo: Flickr

Queen Mary
Queen Mary